La Révolution is a 2020 French-language supernatural drama series produced by Netflix starring Doudou Masta, Julien Sarazin and Ian Turiak. In January 2021, the series was canceled after one season.

Premise 
1787. Amid the decadence of the Ancien Régime, Joseph Ignace Guillotin is responsible for investigating mysterious murders. He then discovers the existence of "blue blood". This unknown virus spreads within the aristocracy. The virus has devastating effects: the infected nobles attack the "little people", upsetting the social order. The revolt spreads and is the prelude to the French Revolution.

Cast 
  – Joseph Ignace Guillotin
  – Élise de Montargis
 Doudou Masta – Oka
 Amélia Lacquemant – Madeleine
  – Albert Guillotin
  – Donatien de Montargis
  – Ophélie
 Isabel Aimé González-Sola – Katell
 Laurent Lucas – Charles de Montargis
  – Edmond de Pérouse
 Gaia Weiss – Marianne
 Ian Turiak – Louis XVI
 Geoffrey Carlassare – Donatien's disciple

Episodes

Release
La Révolution was released on 16 October 2020 on Netflix.

Production

Filming 
Filming took place in Vexin en Val-d'Oise and Rambouillet en Yvelines, in May 2019, as well as the Plage de la Vieille Église in Barneville-Carteret in Manche, in September 2019.

References

External links
 
 
 
 

French-language Netflix original programming
2020s French drama television series
Television shows set in France
Television series set in the 1780s
French supernatural television series